William "Bill" Edward Kettler (Bill Kettler, William E. Kettler)'s grandparents were German immigrants, Emil Kettler and Amalie Ruoff – farmers and land owners.

His parents were William Frederick Kettler and Margaret Cecelia Connors. 

He was born: March 10, 1922 in Garden Grove, CA.

He was Valedictorian of his class at Springdale Elementary. He was one of two children in his graduating class.

Around 1935, as a young boy, he often hiked in the rural area now called the Bolsa Chica wetlands mesa. On his hikes, he found arrowheads, cogs, and two full skeletons in what is now known to be the Indian Middens of the Juaneño (Gabrielino-Tongva Band of Mission Indians). He brought them home until around 1950 when he met an American Indian – Apache, named Colonel Ted Davis, who convinced him that the bones needed a dignified burial. So the bones were buried privately without ceremony in the Smith (now Good Shepherd) Cemetery.

Bill graduated from Huntington Beach Union High School in 1939.

Bill married Marjorie Marie Smith on Sept. 23, 1943.
He went to UCLA from 1939-1942.
He enlisted in the Army Aircorp (the US Airforce) in 1942 during WWII.
He entered the US Army Technical Training School at Yale and was commissioned after graduation.
While serving during World War II., Bill was stationed in Alaska and he and his men discovered the first fully intact Japanese Zero warplane. The Zero was shipped to the mainland where it was studied and its inherent weaknesses were integrated into training which helped to save countless American and Allied forces lives. 
When the war ended, Bill was a captain but stayed in the reserves and retired as a Lt. Colonel.

Then he went to work for his father-in-law at Smith's Mortuary (17 years) with the title that he likes to call "horizontal engineer" or mortician.
In 1962, he became a Financial Consultant with CLU designation in 1971 and Securities Principal.

In the 1990s developers proposed building on the Bolsa Chica land area, claiming that it wasn't an Indian Burial ground. It wasn't until Bill came forward with his buried discovery that the truth would come out. This discovery would later become ORA-83, one of the South County's most significant archeological sites, an 8,000-year-old American Indian village and burial ground.

After serving for 13 years as a trustee of the HB Elementary School District (a three time President) and a trustee for 17 years and a President twice with the Coast Community College, the William E. Kettler school was dedicated in 1973 and was open until June 2005. In 2017, renovations of The William E. Kettler School began. The Kettler School will be converted into headquarters for the Huntington Beach City School District.

His other service titles are: Past President of the Rotary Club of Huntington Beach, past Director of the HB Chamber of Commerce, past member of the HB Planning Commission, served the American Legion and held a position with the Family Service Association.

In 2015\2016 Bill Kettler was honored as the Huntington Beach Outstanding Citizen of the Year.

He is currently a Bolsa Chica Land Trust docent and current board member of the Rotary Club of Huntington Beach Rotary.

Sources 
 
 http://www.huntingtonbeachrotary
 In The Pipeline: Marsh docent gives personal history tour - Huntington Beach Independent

External links
 Bolsa Chica Native Americans
 http://www.scahome.org/publications/proceedings/Proceedings.21Couch.pdf

People from Huntington Beach, California
Rotary International leaders
American archaeologists
American people of German descent